Abdur Rashid Kardar (1904–1989) was an Indian film actor, director and producer. He is credited with establishing the film industry in the Bhati Gate locality of Lahore, British India (now in Pakistan).

Early career
Kardar started as an arts scholar and a calligraphist making posters for foreign film productions and writing for newspapers of the early 1920s. His work would often lead him to meet filmmakers around India.

In 1928, the first silent film, The Daughters of Today was released in Lahore at a time when the city only had nine operational cinema houses. Most of the films shown in theatres in Lahore were either made in Bombay or Calcuta, besides ones made in Hollywood or London. The Daughters of Today was the brain-child of G.K. Mehta, a former officer with the North-Western Railway, who had imported a camera into the country for this very project from London. He asked Kardar to assist him as an assistant director on the project and ended up giving Kardar his début role in his film as an actor. Muhammad Ismail, his friend and fellow calligraphist, accompanied Kardar in the making of the film.

The film was produced in the first open studio in the city near the Bradlaw Hall. It is believed that some other films had been produced indigenously at the studios which had to be closed down for financial reasons. After finishing shooting for the film, Kardar was not approached for another role for a long time. Hailing from the Bhati Gate locality, where it was not unusual to find writers and poets, Kardar saw a viable future for a film industry.

Laying foundations for a film industry
In 1928, with no work left after their maiden venture, Kardar and Ismail sold their belongings to set up a studio and production company under the name of United Players Corporation, the foundation stone for the film industry in Lahore. After scouting for locations, they settled for their offices to be established at Ravi Road. Although, the dim-lit area presented with much difficulties after the studios were established. Shootings were only possible in the day-light but nevertheless the area had some very important landmarks like the Ravi Forest and the tombs of Mughal emperor Jahangir and his wife Nur Jahan, the queen.

It is reported that the team working at the studios would commute on tangas and even lost equipment once while travelling on the bumpy roads on the horse-drawn carriage. However basic and crude their working conditions, Kardar believed in his work and in 1930 he produced the first film under the studio's banner.

With this film, Husn Ka Daku a.k.a. Mysterious Eagle, Kardar made his first directorial début. He also cast himself as an actor in the male lead opposite Gulzar Begum with Ismail in a supporting role. The film featured an American actor, Iris Crawford, as well. The film had mild success at theatres but prominently established Lahore as a functioning film industry. Kardar vowed on not acting in any other film and instead focusing on direction.

Immediately afterwards the studio released the film Sarfarosh aka Brave Heart, with Gul Hamid playing the lead rold with more or less the same cast as in the previous film. This production proved equally appealing but was able to stir noise about this industry in film production circles throughout India. Roop Lal Shori, a resident of Brandreth Road in Lahore, upon hearing of a new film industry in the city, returned to his hometown. He later produced Qismat Ke Haer Pher aka Life After Death which would firmly ground the new industry's reputation as being in line with other film industries of the time.

Setting up of Kardar Productions
Kardar shifted to Calcutta in 1930; and joined the East India Film Company, where he made about seven films for them. After the company closed down in 1937 he moved to Bombay and joined Film City (in Tardeo) where he made one film Baaghban. It won the Gohar Gold Medal starring Bimla Kumari, B. Nandrekar and Sitara Devi.

Subsequently, he joined Ranjeet Movietone towards the end of 1937 and made only three movies with them. From here he moved to Circo Productions Ltd., but just one year later, in 1939, when Circo Productions Ltd. went into liquidation Kardar bought out the company and started Kardar Productions. In the same compound, he also started Kardar Studios and started making movies under the Kardar Productions banner from 1940 onwards. Kardar Studios was one of the best equipped studios in those days and also the first to have air-conditioned make up rooms.  "During his long career, A. R. Kardar worked his way up the ladder from a poster-maker to a studio owner".

Later years
In 1946, Kardar gave a commercially successful film with K. L. Saigal and composer Naushad, Shahjehan (1946). Claimed as a "masterpiece"- all songs of the film songs became hits.

Following partition in 1947, A. R. Kardar and his brother-in-law Mehboob Khan both left for Pakistan. However, according to Bunny Reuben, as quoted by Mihir Bose, they returned to India, but no reason was given for their return.

Kardar went back to film making and directed Dard (1947), which starred Suraiya and had music by Naushad. Dillagi (1949), a romantic tragedy, was a commercial success at the box-office. Inspired by Wuthering Heights (1939), Kardar later used the plot in Dil Diya Dard Liya (1966). Dillagi's music by Naushad became extremely popular, especially Suraiya's song "Tu Mera Chand". Dulari (1949) had equally popular music, with a memorable Mohammed Rafi song "Suhani Raat Dhal Chuki". It starred Geeta Bali, Madhubala and Suresh (not Shyam as people mistakenly put his name). Suresh used to be a child artist and has acted in several films like Basant (starring Mumtaz Shanti, Ulhaas and baby Madhubala then).

Dastan (1950) a tragic melodrama, was inspired from the film Enchantment, and was cited as "one of the biggest commercial hits". Jadoo (1951) and Deewana (1952) marked the parting of ways between Kardar and Naushad. Dil-E-Nadaan (1953) had popular music by Ghulam Mohammed. He made three more films before starting Dil Diya Dard Liya (1966), which again had music by Naushad. Kardar's last film was Mere Sartaj (1975).

Contributions
He introduced many artists to the Hindi film industry who went on to become renowned in their own right, such as Naushad, Majrooh Sultanpuri, Suraiya and the actor/producer/director Nazir Ahmed Khan who migrated to Pakistan in 1947 and became one of the founders of the Pakistani film industry. The legendary singer Mohammad Rafi got his first hit from the song, 'Suhani raat dhal chuki' – from Kardar's film Dulari (1949). He also started the Kardar-Kolynos Contest, to find new talent and through this contest he discovered and introduced to the industry, Chand Usmani and Mahendra Kapoor.

Family and death
Kardar married twice. His first wife was Akhtar Sultana Kardar. They had some children together (number unclear), including one son, who was the eldest of Kardar's children. The son died at the age of three. Akhtar Sultana Kardar died in 1988, one year before her husband.

Kardar's second wife was Bahar, whose sister, Sardar, was the second wife of film maker Mehboob Khan. It is unclear how many children Kardar had with Bahar. However, in all, Kardar had six daughters and one son. The son died in infancy. Five of Kardar's daughters are married and live abroad. Only the youngest daughter, Yasmin Kardar, lives in India. She looks after the distribution rights of her father's films.

Kardar, who lived at Marine Drive, died at the age of 85, on 22 November 1989, in Mumbai, Maharashtra. Kardar's daughter Yasmin is quoted as saying, "The press once told me that my father lived and breathed films".

Kardar was the step-brother of Pakistan's famous cricketer A. H. Kardar (Abdul Hafeez Kardar).

Awards
 Indian Motion Pictures' Producers Association (IMPPA) Award for his outstanding contribution to Indian cinema.

Filmography

As a film director
 1930	Husn Ka Daku
 1930	Sarfarosh
 1930	Safdar Jung
 1930	Farebi Shahzada
 1931	Farebi Daku
 1931	Khooni Katar
 1932	Heer Ranjha
 1933	Aurat Ka Pyar
 1934	Chandragupta
 1934	Sultana
 1935	Swarg Ki Seedhi
 1936	Baghi Sipahi
 1937	Mandir
 1937	Milap
 1938	Baghban
 1939	Thokar
 1940	Holi
 1940	Pagal
 1940	Pooja
 1941	Swami 
 1942	Nai Duniya
 1942	Sharda
 1943	Kanoon 
 1943	Sanjog
 1944	Pehle Aap
 1945	Sanyasi
 1946	Shahjehan
 1947	Dard
 1949	Dillagi 
 1949	Dulari
 1950	Dastan 
 1951	Jadoo
 1952	Deewana
 1953	Dil-E-Nadaan
 1955	Baap Re Baap 
 1955	Yasmin
 1958	Do Phool 
 1966	Dil Diya Dard Liya
 1975	Mere Sartaj

As a film producer
 1931	Bhatakta Joban a.k.a. Awara Raqasa/Wandering Dancer (producer), directed by J. K. Nanda
 1941 Kurmai (A Punjabi language film)
 1944	Geet a.k.a. The Song (producer)
 1947	Dard (producer)

As a writer
 1938	Baghban (dialogue / screenplay)
 1940	Pagal (story)

As an actor
 1928	Daughters of Today
 1929 Husn Ka Daku
 1929	Heer Ranjha

As an assistant film director
 1928	Daughters of Today (assistant director)

Trivia
Recently some photographs by Life magazine's James Burke emerged which showed the prevalence of the casting couch in the Hindi Film Industry way back in the 1950s as well. Kardar was auditioning young women for roles in his films and the photographs showed the women posing in front of him in various stages of undress.

See also
 A. J. Kardar

References

External links
 

1904 births
1989 deaths
Film directors from Lahore
Indian screenwriters
Indian film producers
20th-century Indian Muslims
Punjabi people
20th-century Indian film directors
20th-century Indian male actors
20th-century Indian screenwriters